ARB College Sporting Club is a professional Bangladeshi women's football club from Noakhali. Its a team of Bangladesh Women's Football League.

History
The club were founded on 5 March 2021 before began Bangladesh Women's Championship and it participated 2020–21 Bangladesh Womens Football League season. The club has played inaugural match against Cumilla United on 2 April 2021 and  left the field 0–4 margin victory.

Current squad

ARB College Sporting Club squad for 2021–22 BWFL

Competitive record

Club management

Current technical staff
As of 10 November 2022

Head coach records

Honours

League 

 Bangladesh Women's Football League
Runners Up: 2020–21, 2021–22

See also 

 Bashundhara Kings Women
Nasrin Sporting Club 
FC Brahmanbaria
Jamalpur Kacharipara Akadas
Bangladesh Women's Football League

References

2019 establishments in Bangladesh
Association football clubs established in 2019
Women's football clubs in Bangladesh